Eucalyptus consideniana, commonly known as yertchuk, is a species of plant in the myrtle family and is endemic to south-eastern Australia. It is a tree with rough, fibrous, sometimes prickly bark on the trunk and larger branches, smooth grey bark above, lance-shaped or curved adult leaves, flower buds in groups of between eleven and nineteen, white flowers and conical to hemispherical fruit.

Description
It has grey, prickly, fibrous bark on the trunk and larger branches, smooth grey or yellowish bark that is shed in ribbons on the thinner branches. Flowering occurs between September and December and the flowers are white.

Taxonomy and naming
Eucalyptus consideniana was first formally described in 1904 by Joseph Maiden from a specimen he collected in Springwood with Henry Deane. The description was published in Proceedings of the Linnean Society of New South Wales. Maiden gave the species the specific epithet consideniana to honour "First-Assistant Surgeon D. Considen, one of the founders of Australia". Maiden also noted that "it would appear that Considen was the founder of the Eucalyptus oil industry."

Distribution and habitat
Yertchuk usually grows in poorly drained soil in open forest and is found in areas between Sydney and Melbourne on the coast and nearby tablelands.

References

consideniana
Myrtales of Australia
Plants described in 1904
Flora of New South Wales
Flora of Victoria (Australia)
Trees of Australia
Taxa named by Joseph Maiden